The Journal de St.-Pétersbourg or Journal de Saint-Pétersbourg was a French-language newspaper, published in Saint Petersburg, Russia, with varying periodicity and some interruptions, from 1825 to 1914. For at least some of this period it was an official or semi-official organ of the Russian Foreign Ministry.

References

External links
 Scans of the Journal de St.-Pétersbourg, 15/27 December 1825, made available by the Academy of Athens.

Newspapers published in Russia
French-language newspapers published in Europe
Publications established in 1873
Publications disestablished in 1914
Mass media in Saint Petersburg
Defunct newspapers published in Russia
1825 establishments in the Russian Empire
1914 disestablishments in the Russian Empire